Princess Maria Anna Amalia of Courland (12 June 1653 – 16 June 1711) was Landgravine of Hesse-Kassel through her marriage to Charles I, Landgrave of Hesse-Kassel. She was the child of Jacob Kettler, Duke of Courland and Semigallia and Margravine Louise Charlotte of Brandenburg. Her eldest son was King Frederick I of Sweden. One of her daughters was the most recent common ancestor of all currently reigning monarchs in Europe from 1939 to 1941 and 1943 to 2022.

Life 
Maria Amalia was the daughter of Jacob Kettler, Duke of Courland and Semigallia (1610–1681) and his wife, Princess Louise Charlotte of Brandenburg (1617–1676).

During the Northern Wars, from 1658 to 1660 Maria Amalia and her family were kept as prisoners by the invading Swedes in Riga and later in Ivangorod. 

She was first engaged to her first cousin William VII, Landgrave of Hesse-Kassel (1651–1670), but he died during his Grand Tour. She was then engaged to William's younger brother and heir, Charles I, Landgrave of Hesse-Kassel (1654–1730), whom she married on 21 May 1673 in Kassel.

As landgravine, she participated in the creation of the Karlsaue Park in Kassel. The marmor fountain in the park contains a medallion by the Roman sculptor Pierre Etienne Monnot depicting Maria Amalia. In 1699, together with her son Maximilian, she bought Sensenstein Castle. She was described as modest, affable and pious.

Maria Amalia died in 1711 and was buried in the Martinskirche of Kassel. The village of Mariendorf in Hesse, Germany was named in her memory.

Issue 

Maria Amalia and her husband Charles had seventeen children, nine of whom survived to adulthood. Their eldest surviving son, Frederick I succeeded his father as Landgrave of Hesse-Kassel, while also becoming King of Sweden; their second-eldest surviving son William VIII also became landgrave after his brother's death
 William (1674–1676)
 Charles (1675–1677)
 Frederick I (1676–1751), Landgrave of Hesse-Kassel, King of Sweden, married firstly Princess Louise Dorothea of Prussia (1680–1705) in 1700 and had no issue; married secondly Queen Ulrika Eleonora of Sweden (1688–1741) in 1715 and had no issue

 Christian (1677–1677)
 Sophie Charlotte (1678–1749), married Duke Frederick William of Mecklenburg-Schwerin (1675–1713) in 1704 and had no issue

 Stillborn son (1679)
 Charles (1680–1702)
 William VIII (1682–1760), Landgrave of Hesse-Kassel, married Princess Dorothea Wilhelmina of Saxe-Zeitz (1691–1743) in 1717 and had issue
 Leopold (1684–1704)
 Louis (1686–1706)
 Marie Luise (1688–1765), married Prince John William Friso of Nassau-Dietz (1687–1711) in 1709 and had issue; together with her husband, were the most recent common ancestors of all currently reigning monarchs in Europe from 1939 to 1941 and from 1943 to 2022
 Maximilian (1689–1753), married Friederike Charlotte of Hesse-Darmstadt in 1720, and had issue
 Daughter (1690)
 George Charles (1691–1755)
 Eleonore (1694)
 Wilhelmine Charlotte (1695–1722)
 Child (1696)

Ancestors

References and sources 
 Christian Röth: Geschichte von Hessen p. 305
 

|-

1653 births
1711 deaths
People from Jelgava
House of Hesse-Kassel
People from the Duchy of Courland and Semigallia
Landgravines of Hesse-Kassel
17th-century German people
18th-century German people